The 2021–22 season was A.S. Roma's 95th season in existence and the club's 70th consecutive season in the top flight of Italian football. In addition to the domestic league, Roma participated in this season's editions of the Coppa Italia and the inaugural edition of the UEFA Europa Conference League, winning the latter tournament for the club's first major trophy since the 2007–08 Coppa Italia.

The season began with José Mourinho at the helm after Roma announced last season that Paulo Fonseca would step down.

Players

First-team squad

Other players under contract

Out on loan

Transfers

In

Loans in

Out

Loans out

Pre-season and friendlies

Competitions

Overview

Serie A

League table

Results summary

Results by round

Matches
The league fixtures were announced on 14 July 2021.

Coppa Italia

UEFA Europa Conference League

Play-off round

The draw for the play-off round was held on 2 August.

Group stage

The draw for the group stage was held on 27 August 2021.

Knockout phase

Round of 16
The round of 16 draw was held on 25 February 2022.

Quarter-finals
The draw for the quarter-finals was held on 18 March 2022.

Semi-finals
The draw for the semi-finals was held on 18 March 2022, after the quarter-final draw.

Final

Statistics

Appearances and goals

|-
! colspan=14 style="background:#B21B1C; color:#FFD700; text-align:center"| Goalkeepers

|-
! colspan=14 style="background:#B21B1C; color:#FFD700; text-align:center"| Defenders

|-
! colspan=14 style="background:#B21B1C; color:#FFD700; text-align:center"| Midfielders

|-
! colspan=14 style="background:#B21B1C; color:#FFD700; text-align:center"| Forwards

|-
! colspan=14 style="background:#B21B1C; color:#FFD700; text-align:center"| Players transferred out during the season

Goalscorers

References

External links

A.S. Roma seasons
Roma
2021–22 UEFA Europa Conference League participants seasons
UEFA Europa Conference League-winning seasons